Puritan is an unincorporated community in Vinton County, in the U.S. state of Ohio. It is situated to the east of Hamden, Ohio, and to the west of Wilkesville, Ohio, as well as north of Wellston, Ohio.

History
Puritan was originally known for its brick-making industry. The area where Puritan once stood is the home of the only remaining coal company, Sands Hill Mining, in Vinton County. There is also a church, a nursing home, and some remaining buildings of the brick plant.

References

Unincorporated communities in Vinton County, Ohio
Unincorporated communities in Ohio